Thunder Road International Speedbowl, more commonly known as just Thunder Road, is a  high-banked, paved short track speedway located in the town of Barre, Vermont. The track was founded by Ken Squier in 1960. and sold by Squier and co-owner Tom Curley in the spring of 2017 to former Thunder Road track champion Cris Michaud and local businessman Pat Malone. Currently, Thunder Road hosts three weekly divisions: Late Models, Flying Tigers, and Street Stocks. The track is known for hosting its weekly races on Thursday night. As of April 2020, it was one of three active race tracks in Vermont.

History
Ken Squier envisioned the need for an asphalt track in the area which had been full of dirt tracks. He worked with pavement contractor Reginald Cooley to build the track. Squier operated the track until selling to local businessman Tommy Kalomiris. Kalomiris operated the track for two years; he faced lawsuits in 1978 and the track only ran six events that year. Squier bought the track back in 1979 along with Tom Curley. After running four events in 1981, the duo was forced to shut the track down again due to a lawsuit. They regained control by 1982 and operated it until April 2017. They sold the track to former track champion Cris Michaud and real estate developer Pat Malone.

In 2009, as part of its 50th Season in operation, Thunder Road was visited by NASCAR legends Richard Petty and Bobby Allison. Current NASCAR drivers Tony Stewart, Clint Bowyer and David Ragan raced there at different events during the season as well.

The track will host the second event of the 2023 Superstar Racing Experience season on July 20th, 2023.

Touring Series
In the past, Thunder Road had hosted 22 races of NASCAR North Tour between 1979 and 1985. Winners include Chuck Bown, Robbie Crouch, Randy Lajoie, and Kevin Lepage. After the formation of the American-Canadian Tour in 1986, Thunder Road became sanctioned by the organization as well as host to nearly 150 ACT races between the Pro Stock, Late Model and Flying Tiger tours as of September, 2021. ACT winners include Jean-Paul Cyr, Brian Hoar and Phil Scott. It hosted 7 races of the NASCAR Busch North Series, a feeder series of NASCAR, between 1997 and 2003.

Currently, the track hosts regional touring series including the American Canadian Tour, the Pro All Stars Series and the New England Antique Racers.  The track has hosted several high profile drivers from the highest level of NASCAR. On June 28, 2007, NASCAR driver Kenny Wallace raced at Thunder Road. Ken Schrader, another NASCAR driver, had raced once at Thunder Road each of the two years prior to Wallace's visit. In 2009, Tony Stewart made an appearance at the track. Clint Bowyer has raced in the track in 2013. Kyle Busch raced in Vermont in 2017. The next year in 2018, Christopher Bell raced at the highbanks. And most recently, Ryan Preece has visited in 2021. All these drivers making an appearance in the Vermont Governor's Cup, which is ran on a Thursday night, which coincides with NASCARs visit to the New Hampshire Motor Speedway over the weekend. Phil Scott, current governor of Vermont, is a former track champion in 1996, 1998, and 2002.

Milk Bowl
Thunder Road has hosted the "Milk Bowl" Late Model race since 1962. It is the season finale each fall, and consists of three 50-lap segments, with cumulative scoring and full-field inversions between segments. The driver with the highest combined total of finishes in the three segments is declared the winner, receives a loving cup full of milk as the trophy, and is expected to kiss a cow in Victory Circle.

Past track champions (King of the Road)
The title of King of the Road is given to the highest points winner of the top weekly division at Thunder Road. While the other divisions have their respective champions, King of the Road is the most coveted title at Thunder Road. There have been fifty-five Kings of the Road; the one female driver who won the track championship, Tracie Bellerose, was christened the 2000 Queen of the Road.  Vermont's governor since 2017, Phil Scott, is a longtime participant in Thunder Road's Late Model series, and is a three-time King of the Road (1996, 1998, 2002).

Sources

External links 
Official site
Thunder Road International SpeedBowl archive at Racing-Reference

Buildings and structures in Barre (town), Vermont
NASCAR tracks
Motorsport venues in Vermont